The Tale of a Shirt is a 1922 Australian silent film directed by P. J. Ramster. It is a comedy about a man on holiday (Charles Russell) who learns he is not as old as he thought. Only a few fragments of the film survive.

References

External links

1922 films
Australian drama films
Australian silent short films
Australian black-and-white films
Lost Australian films
1922 drama films
1922 lost films
Lost drama films
1922 short films
Silent drama films